Harold J. "Bud" Mertz is considered to be the driving force in the creation of the Hybrid III crash test dummy, the standard dummy used today. Working with General Motors in the late 1960s, Mertz designed and built the dummy which is today the only recognized test device in both North America and Europe for restraint devices which protect against frontal collisions.

Mertz earned his bachelor's degree in aeronautical engineering at Wayne State University, and took a course on fluid dynamics under the tutelage of Lawrence Patrick, who was at the time using himself as a guinea pig in investigating the effects of car crashes on humans. Patrick offered Mertz an opportunity to work as his research assistant, and Mertz accepted.

Mertz went on to do his graduate studies at Wayne State, and worked with cadavers in crash testing studies too violent to use live volunteers. He completed his Ph.D. with a dissertation on whiplash-type injuries in 1967, In 1969, he was hired as a senior researcher at GM.

Mertz retired from General Motors in 2005, and lives with his wife in Harper Woods, Michigan.

External links
"GM's 'Father' of Hybrid III Crash Test Dummies Has Dedicated His Career to Automotive Safety", General Motors

20th-century births
Living people
General Motors former executives
Automotive safety pioneers
Wayne State University alumni
People from Harper Woods, Michigan
Year of birth missing (living people)